This page lists candidates contesting electorates in the 2023 New Zealand general election.

General electorates

Auckland Central

|}

Banks Peninsula

|}

Bay of Plenty

|-
!colspan=6| Retiring incumbents and withdrawn candidates
|-

|}

Botany

|}

Christchurch Central

|}

Christchurch East

!colspan=6| Retiring incumbents and withdrawn candidates
|-

|}

Coromandel

|}

Dunedin

!colspan=6| Retiring incumbents and withdrawn candidates
|-

|}

Epsom

|}

Hamilton East

!colspan=6| Retiring incumbents and withdrawn candidates
|-

|}

Hamilton West

|}

Hutt South

|}

Ilam

|}

Invercargill

|}

Kelston

|}

Mana

|}

Māngere

!colspan=6| Retiring incumbents and withdrawn candidates
|-

|}

Manurewa

|}

Maungakiekie

|}

Mount Albert

!colspan=6| Retiring incumbents and withdrawn candidates
|-

|}

Napier

|}

Nelson

|}

New Lynn

|}

New Plymouth

|}

Northcote

|}

Northland

|}

Ōhāriu

|}

Ōtaki

|}

Pakuranga

|}

Palmerston North

|}

Rangitata

|}

Rangitīkei

|-
!colspan=6| Retiring incumbents and withdrawn candidates
|-

|}

Remutaka

|}

Rongotai

!colspan=6| Retiring incumbents and withdrawn candidates
|-

|}

Rotorua

|}

Southland

|}

Taieri

|}

Takanini

|}

Tāmaki 

|}

Taranaki-King Country

|}

Tauranga

|}

Te Atatū

|}

Tukituki 

|}

Upper Harbour

|}

Waikato

|}

Waimakariri

|}

Wairarapa

|}

Waitaki

!colspan=6| Retiring incumbents and withdrawn candidates
|-

|}

Wellington Central

|-
!colspan=6| Retiring incumbents and withdrawn candidates
|-

|}

Whanganui

|}

Whangārei

|-
!colspan=6| Retiring incumbents and withdrawn candidates
|-

|}

Wigram

|}

Māori electorates

Ikaroa-Rāwhiti

|}

Tāmaki Makaurau

|}

Te Tai Hauāuru

!colspan=6| Retiring incumbents and withdrawn candidates
|-

|}

Te Tai Tokerau

|}

Waiariki

|}

References

2023 New Zealand general election
Candidates 2023